The 2013–14 Algerian Ligue Professionnelle 1 was the 52nd season of the Algerian Ligue Professionnelle 1 since its establishment in 1962. A total of 16 teams contested the league, with ES Sétif as the defending champions for the second time consecutively. The league began on August 24, 2013.

Team summaries

Promotion and relegation 
Teams promoted from 2012–13 Algerian Ligue Professionnelle 2
 CRB Aïn Fakroun
 RC Arbaâ
 MO Béjaïa

Teams relegated to 2013-14 Algerian Ligue Professionnelle 2
 CA Batna
 USM Bel-Abbès
 WA Tlemcen

Stadiums and locations

League table

Leader week after week

Season statistics

Top scorers

See also
2013–14 Algerian Ligue Professionnelle 2
2013–14 Algerian Cup

References

External links
Ligue 1 2013-14 - soccerway.com

Algerian Ligue Professionnelle 1 seasons
Algeria
1